MS 1512-cB58 is a galaxy in the Boötes constellation. It is a starburst galaxy that is being strongly gravitationally lensed, magnifying its apparent size by 30−50 times.

References

External links
 FIRST J151422.4+363620
 O mais jovem enxame de protogaláxias?
 MS 1512 +36-cB58
 www.aanda.org/
 Image MS 1512 +36-cB58
 hera.ph1.uni-koeln.de
 SIMBAD 
 UVES Investigates the Environment of a Very Remote Galaxy

Boötes
Spiral galaxies